Subri may refer to
Kovai Subri (1898–1993), Tamil freedom fighter
Mohd Faiz Subri (born 1987), Malaysian football midfielder 
Subri Lake in Pakistan